The Nutty Tarts (Tärähtäneet ämmät FIN) is an art duo formed by two Finnish artists, Katriina Haikala (born 1977) and Vilma Metter (born 1977).

Background
The Nutty Tarts was formed in Helsinki in 2007, with the mission of provoking public conversations that challenge the prevailing power dynamics in contemporary societies. In their creative work, Haikala and Metteri use various forms of art, such as photography, video installation and live performance, to name just a few.  Their motto “Shaken not blurred” relates not only to the variety and diversity of their artistic projects but to their mission of being artistic trouble makers who want to challenge oppressive norms.

The Nutty Tarts’ most noted social art projects are Monokini 2.0 (2013-), Dystopia/Utopia (2013-) and Hairy Underwear (2014-). Their provocative and humorous artwork has received worldwide attention from the international media, including from media outlets like The Huffington Post, El Pais, Le Monde, Il Fotografo, Daily News (New York), Libération and Upworthy.

Projects

Monokini 2.0 - Who says you need two

Monokini 2.0 is a social art project launched in 2013. Ten Finnish fashion designers, such as Mert Otsamo, Tyra Therman, Outi Pyy, participated in the Monokini 2.0 project and together designed a swimwear collection. This swimwear is targeted for women who have experienced breast cancer and mastectomies.

The collection was photographed by Finnish photographer Pinja Valja ]in collaboration with Haikala and Metteri and is modeled by 10 breast cancer survivors. The photographs form a collection that has been exhibited in various galleries in and outside of Finland.

Monokini 2.0 charity Catwalk Show was held in the Yrjönkatu Swimming Hall on 30 August 2014.  The show was the first time that the swimwear collection was publicly showcased.

Dystopia/utopia
Dystopia/utopia is a social art project based on photography and scenario work. The project is created together with 12-17 year-olds who are at risk of becoming marginalized. Working together with Nutty tarts and American photographer Gabriel Mellan, the youngsters used photography to visualize their outlook on life through the concepts of dystopia and utopia. Together with a picture representing the present of each young participant, the dystopian and utopian images formulate a triptych.

The Dystopia/Utopia project was carried out in 2013 and 2014 with the support of Kone Foundation at the Saari Residence  in Mynämäki, Finland. The project is continuing in September and October 2015 in Helsinki with funding from the Myrsky project.

Hairy Underwear
Hairy Underwear is an undergarment collection designed by the Nutty Tarts including underpants, undershirts and leggings. The collection is sold in the Hairy Underwear online webstore  and shipped globally. The collection is designed to provoke discussion about suppressive norms, gender issues and the narrow idea about ideal beauty.

Exhibitions 2013 - 2015
 2015 ”Dystopia / Utopia”, Photographic Gallery Hippolyte, Helsinki, Finland 
 2015 ”Monokini 2.0”, Finnish institute in Stockholm, Stockholm, Sweden
 2015 ”Monokini 2.0”, Kunstplass10, Oslo, Norway
 2014 ”Dresscode”, Spiral Art center, Tokyo, Japan
 2014 ”Monokini 2.0”, Museum Anna Nordlander, Skellefteå, Sweden
 2014 ”Monokini 2.0”, Finnish Museum of Photography, Helsinki, Finland
 2013 ”Dresscode”, The Parsons New School Gallery, New York City, United States

References

External links
 Shaken-not-blurred.com
 Monokin12.com
 Dystopia/autopia website

Art duos
Finnish fashion designers
Finnish women artists
Finnish women fashion designers
1977 births
Living people